Baroque Sketches is an album by trumpeter Art Farmer featuring performances recorded in 1966 and released on the Columbia label in 1967.

Reception

The Penguin Guide to Jazz stated: "Baroque Sketches is a mix of genuine and pastiche baroque (from Bach to John Lewis) helped up with what amount to boogaloo rhythms. Benny Golson was smart enough to make the charts straddle kitsch and a more proper jazz feeling and Farmer, the consummate pro, plays seriously enough".

The Allmusic review said: "Art Farmer enjoyed playing pieces with strong melodies, and the original concept of Baroque Sketches was to adapt the music of Johann Sebastian Bach into a jazz setting. After initial research, it was decided to also include works by Chopin and Albeniz, as well as John Lewis' "Little David's Fugue" and Sonny Rollins' "Alfie Theme." With arrangements by his former Jazztet partner Benny Golson, Farmer creates music that is entertaining, though unlikely to stand up to repeated listening".

Track listing
 "Fuja XI" (Johann Sebastian Bach) - 3:01	
 "Aria" (Bach) - 3:56	
 "Little David's Fuge" (John Lewis) - 2:37	
 "Prelude in E Minor" (Frédéric Chopin) - 2:58	
 "Sinfonia" (Bach) - 2:26	
 "Zortzico" (Isaac Albéniz) - 2:17	
 "Alfie's Theme" (Sonny Rollins) - 2:03
 "Jesu" (Bach) - 3:34	
 "Etude" (Chopin) - 3:25	
 "Prelude in A Minor" (Chopin) - 2:55	
 "Rhythm of Life" (Cy Coleman, Dorothy Fields) - 2:43

Personnel
Art Farmer - flugelhorn
Don Butterfield - tuba
Ted Gompers, Romeo Penque - reeds
George Duvivier – bass
Don Lamond - drums
Phil Kraus  percussion
Benny Golson - arranger
Unknown musicians - trumpet, flugelhorn, trombone, French horn, harp

References 

Columbia Records albums
Art Farmer albums
1967 albums
Albums produced by Teo Macero